Dorothy may refer to:
Dorothy (given name), a list of people with that name.

Arts and entertainment

Characters 
Dorothy Gale, protagonist of The Wonderful Wizard of Oz by L. Frank Baum
Ace (Doctor Who) or Dorothy, a character played by Sophie Aldred in Doctor Who
Dorothy, a goldfish on Sesame Street owned by Elmo
Dorothy the Dinosaur, a costumed green dinosaur who appears with The Wiggles
Dorothy (MÄR), a main character in MÄR
Dorothy Baxter, a main character on Hazel
Dorothy "Dottie" Turner, main character of Servant
Dorothy Michaels, Dustin Hoffman's character the movie Tootsie

Film and television 
Dorothy (TV series), 1979 American TV series
Dorothy Mills, a 2008 French movie, sometimes titled simply Dorothy
DOROTHY, a device used to study tornadoes in the movie Twister

Music 
Dorothy (band), a Los Angeles-based rock band
Dorothy, the title of an Old English dance and folk song by Seymour Smith
"Dorothy", a 2019 song by Sulli
"Dorothy", a 2016 song by Her's

In other media 
Dorothy (opera), a comic opera (1886) by Stephenson & Cellier
Dorothy (Chase), a 1902 painting by William Merritt Chase
Dorothy (comic book), a comic book based on the Wizard of Oz
Dorothy, a publishing project, an American publisher

Places 
Dorothy, Alberta, a hamlet in the Canadian province of Alberta
Dorothy, West Virginia, an unincorporated community in West Virginia, United States
Dorothy (Venusian crater)
Dorothy (Charonian crater)

Nautical 
Dorothy (1815 ship), an English merchant ship
, a United States Navy patrol boat in commission from 1917 to 1918
, A Malaysian tug in service 1958-75

See also
Friend of Dorothy, archaic crypto-euphemism for "gay"
Hurricane Dorothy (disambiguation)
Dorothea (disambiguation)
Dorothee (given name), an alternate spelling to Dorothy